Winter Plunderband, Beatallica's third extended play CD, was released on November 17, 2009. It is Beatallica's first ever Holiday Season release. The EP is only available at Beatallica live shows (very limited pressing) and can also be purchased as a digital download, which includes a digital booklet with artwork, lyrics (to the Beatallica songs) and over nineteen photos (including a handful of photos taken backstage on April 1, 2009, in Paris, France, with Beatallica and Metallica together).

The CD version does not contain any lyrics or photos, just the cover artwork and on the back there is artwork with a skeleton wearing a Santa Claus Hat on a snowy rooftop (from the Heretic lyrics page from the Digital Booklet) along with the song titles and production credits. The physical CD has an image of many skeleton reindeer that encircles the face of the CD, this imagery does not appear in the digital booklet when purchased as a digital download.

The songs included are covers of Paul McCartney’s "Wonderful Christmastime" and John Lennon and Yoko Ono’s "Happy Xmas (War Is Over)" and also the very first two Beatallica original songs: "Hella Day for Holiday" and "Heretic".

This is the first release by Beatallica that does not conform to their mash-up style that consists of music made from combinations of songs from the Beatles and Metallica.

The band played "Wonderful Christmastime", "Hella Day for Holiday" and "Happy Christmas (War Is Over)" live for the first time on November 25, 2009, at the Northern Lights Theater in Milwaukee, Wisconsin (official Winter Plunderband release party). This show was recorded live by the band for possible use in the future.

Track listing
"Wonderful Christmastime" - 4:00
"Hella Day for Holiday" - 3:48
"Happy Christmas (War Is Over)" - 4:35
"Heretic" - 3:55

Production
 Beatallica are: Jaymz Lennfield, Ringo Larz, Kliff McBurtney, Grg III
 Back up vox by the Skully Santa Singers: Jaymz, Kliff, Flemball, and Jessi
 Recorded by Flemball Rasmartin between Aug - Sept 2009 at Bobby Peru’s Holiday Haunt, Milwaukee, WI:
 Produced by Beatallica and Flemball
 World contact and booking to beatallica@sbcglobal.net
 European booking to tanja@sittichbooking.com
 Art by Eric Von Munz
 Art manipulation by Anjl Rodee
 Art concept by Eric and Jaymz

References

Winter Plunderband video chronicles
 Jaymz Announcement
 In Studio
 Jaymz on Wonderful Christmastime
 Jaymz on Hella Day For Holiday
 Jaymz on Happy Christmas (War Is Over)
 Jaymz on Heretic
 Winter Plunderband Commercial

External links
Beatallica's official website

Beatallica albums
2009 EPs
Oglio Records EPs
2000s comedy albums